The Prevention of Terrorism (Temporary Provisions) Act 1989 was one of the Prevention of Terrorism Acts of the United Kingdom related to The Troubles in Northern Ireland.

Powers contained in the Acts 
The Prevention of Terrorism (Temporary Provisions) Act 1989 had seven parts:

 Proscribed Organisations  Allowed for organisations to be made illegal, making membership an arrestable offence. It was also an offence to solicit financial support for any listed group, display signs of public support, or attend a meeting supporting a listed group or addressed by a group member. The maximum penalty was ten years' imprisonment and an unlimited fine. The initial groups outlawed were the Provisional Irish Republican Army (IRA) and the Irish National Liberation Army (INLA) in the United Kingdom and numerous loyalist groups within Northern Ireland.

 Exclusion Orders  Exclusion orders could be issued "as expedient" to prevent terrorism relating to Northern Ireland. Orders were issued against individuals to either prevent them entering or being in Great Britain, to exclude them from Northern Ireland, or to exclude them from the United Kingdom. It was an offence to breach an order or to aid another in effecting entry, the maximum sentence was five years' imprisonment and an unlimited fine.

 Financial Assistance for Terrorism  As well as the provision under the first part of the Act, contributing, receiving or soliciting financial support for terrorism was an offence under this part also. Additionally, it was an offence to contribute any other resources; to assist in the retention or control of funds for proscribed groups or terrorist acts; or to fail to disclose to the police any suspicions notwithstanding any other restriction. The maximum penalty was fourteen years' imprisonment and an unlimited fine.

 Arrest, Detention and Control of Entry  This part allowed for the arrest of individuals without a warrant and on reasonable suspicion that they were guilty of an offence under the Act or otherwise "concerned in the commission, preparation or instigation of acts of terrorism". The period of initial detention was up to 48 hours, this could be extended by a maximum of five additional days by the Home Secretary. The detainee was exempted from certain provisions of other Acts relating to the arrest procedure and the legal protection of those arrested. This part also allowed for streamlined search procedures of persons or property and checks under the Act on persons at port or other border controls.

The remaining parts of the Act (Information, Proceedings and Interpretation, Further Provisions for Northern Ireland, and Supplementary) are largely technical, although the Northern Ireland provisions extend the right to search property, restricts remission for those convicted of statutory offences, and tightens control over the granting of licenses under the Explosives Act 1875 (new explosives factories and magazines).

The Troubles (Northern Ireland)
United Kingdom Acts of Parliament 1989
Emergency laws in the United Kingdom
Acts of the Parliament of the United Kingdom concerning Northern Ireland
1989 in Northern Ireland
Terrorism laws in the United Kingdom
Repealed United Kingdom Acts of Parliament